Ralph Gregory Milliard (born 30 December 1973 in Willemstad, Curaçao, Netherlands Antilles) is a former Dutch baseball player and current baseball coach. Milliard represented the Netherlands at the 2000 Summer Olympics in Sydney where he and his team placed fifth. Four years later at the 2004 Summer Olympics in Athens they placed sixth.

Profile
Milliard started playing baseball at age four in his native country Curaçao. When he was nine he moved with his family to Soest in The Netherlands where he played with the Knickerbockers club in the youth divisions. He was selected at age 14 to be part of the National youth team, the Cadetten. At age sixteen he moved to HCAW and played at the highest level, the Dutch Honkbal Hoofdklasse and developed into a talented short stop and second baseman.

Professional career
In 1992 he signed a contract with the Florida Marlins and played in total ten seasons as a professional from which three seasons were at the major league level. His strong point was his superb fielding as a shortstop and second baseman. He played for the Marlins, the New York Mets and the Cincinnati Reds. In 1996 he debuted in the Major Leagues for the Marlins on 12 May of that year. He was the second player from Curaçao to get to the Major Leagues and the eleventh Dutchman to do so. As a second baseman for the Marlins Milliard played 32 games in two seasons and won the World Series. In 1998 he played another 10 games at second base and shortstop. In 2001 Milliard was sold from the San Diego Padres to the Cleveland Indians. With this club he failed to get into the major league selection and decided to return to The Netherlands.

National team
Milliard played for the Dutch national team during the Olympics in Sydney in 2000. Also in 2002 he played for the team in various tournaments. During the Haarlemse honkbalweek in 2004 he played in every game as second baseman and won the prize for the Best Defensive Player. He got ten players out and assisted in 19 outs and was faultless during the whole tournament. During the Olympic Games of 2004 he played again and was awarded the prize for Best Second Baseman of the tournament. He played 75 games for the National team. His last one was in August 2004 against Chinese Tapei during the Olympics.

Coaching
Milliard played after his return to The Netherlands from 2001 to 2008 for HCAW. In 2009, he became coach of the then still existing Rookie team, the young players selection who were in the waiting room for the main squad. During winter he is one of the instructors of the HCAW baseball winter academy for young players. In 2011, he left HCAW and succeeded Marcel Joost as one of the coaches for another Hoofdklasse team, Kinheim. In 2012 the team won the national title just two weeks after he and his colleague had been fired. In 2014, he was head coach of the Twins selection and in 2015 he returned to HCAW to lead the team as head coach for two seasons. In 2017 he is again head coach of the first junior selection 16–21 years of HCAW.

References

Milliard at the Dutch Olympic Archive

1973 births
Baseball players at the 2000 Summer Olympics
Baseball players at the 2004 Summer Olympics
Buffalo Bisons (minor league) players
Charlotte Knights players
Chattanooga Lookouts players
Curaçao baseball players
Curaçao expatriate baseball players in the United States
Dutch people of Curaçao descent
Florida Marlins players
Kane County Cougars players
Las Vegas Stars (baseball) players
Living people
Major League Baseball players from Curaçao
Major League Baseball second basemen
New York Mets players
Norfolk Tides players
Olympic baseball players of the Netherlands
Portland Sea Dogs players
People from Willemstad
Gulf Coast Marlins players
Mr. Cocker HCAW players